Penelope Cook (13 July 1957 – 26 December 2018) was an Australian actress, stage director, TV presenter and writer. She played roles in the soap opera A Country Practice, as Vicki Dean Bowen from 1981 to 1985, E Street as lead anchor-character, Dr Elly Fielding, between 1989 and 1991, and Neighbours in the recurring role of Prue Brown  from 2007 to 2010. She was also a presenter on travel show The Great Outdoors

Early life
Cook was born in Melbourne, and grew up in Woollahra, Sydney. Her mother was a physiotherapist and her father served in the Royal Australian Navy, based at Garden Island Naval Precinct. After completing high school, Cook auditioned for the National Institute of Dramatic Art (NIDA) but failed to gain a place. Instead, her mother helped her get a radiography traineeship at Royal Prince Alfred Hospital. A year later, Cook auditioned for NIDA again and was successful. She graduated in 1978.

Career

Television
Cook made her debut on television in 1979 as Susie Denning in soap opera, The Restless Years. Her most well-known role was as veterinarian Vicky Dean Bowen in the drama series, A Country Practice, and was one of the longest serving early actors in that series appearing from its inception in November 1981 until 1985, and 330 episodes, a role for which she won Logie Awards in 1984 and 1985. Her relationship and wedding in A Country Practice to Dr Simon Bowen, played by Grant Dodwell, became one of the highest rated and most popular storylines of that series. After a break from television for over two years, Cook returned in 1989 to play Dr Elly Fielding in a new Ten Network soap opera, E Street. This role had been especially created for her, and Cook remained in the series from 1989 to early 1991. She went on to a guest role in ABC's medical drama G.P..

From 1992 to 1996 Cook was a presenter on the Australian travel show The Great Outdoors. She appeared in the police drama Young Lions in 2002. From June 2007 until late 2010, she joined the cast of Australian soap opera Neighbours in the recurring role of Prue Brown, mother of Frazer Yeats (Ben Lawson) and Ringo Brown (Sam Clark). Cook also guest starred in episodes of All Saints in 2007 and 2008. In 2017, she played a supporting role in the ABC hospital drama Pulse.

Theatre
Cook had a long involvement in the theatre, both as an actress and director. She was involved in nearly 40 stage productions, including at the Ensemble Theatre and the Sydney Theatre Company, and helped establish the Griffin Theatre Company in 1979. Her most notable stage appearances included the John Bell–Richard Tognetti production of The Soldier's Tale with the Australian Chamber Orchestra and the Australian tour of Oscar Wilde's An Ideal Husband, directed in Sydney by English director Sir Peter Hall.

She served on the board of Sydney's Monkey Baa Theatre and worked extensively with the Australian Theatre for Young People.

Personal life and death
Cook was married twice; first to radio broadcaster and television personality Clive Robertson and subsequently to businessman David Lynch. In 1998 they had a daughter, Poppy.

Cook died from cancer on 26 December 2018, aged 61.

Filmography

Film

Television

References

External links

1957 births
2018 deaths
Australian film actresses
Australian stage actresses
National Institute of Dramatic Art alumni
Australian soap opera actresses
Deaths from cancer in Australia
20th-century Australian actresses
21st-century Australian actresses
20th-century Australian women writers
20th-century Australian writers
21st-century Australian women writers
21st-century Australian writers